Henare Wepiha Te Wainohu (1882–1920) was a notable New Zealand tribal leader, Anglican clergyman, army chaplain. Of Māori descent, he identified with the Ngāti Kahungunu and Ngāti Pāhauwera iwi. He was born in Mohaka, Hawke's Bay, New Zealand in 1882.

References

1882 births
1920 deaths
Ngāti Kahungunu people
Ngāti Pāhauwera people
New Zealand Māori religious leaders
New Zealand military chaplains
People from Wairoa District
New Zealand Anglican priests
People educated at Te Aute College
Māori in the military